Melvin Lee Gibson (born December 30, 1940) is a retired American basketball player and coach.  The 6'3" and 180 lb former Western Carolina University guard played a single season in the National Basketball Association (NBA) with the Los Angeles Lakers in 1963–64, in which he appeared in nine games and recorded a total of 13 points. He played for the U.S. men's team at the 1963 FIBA World Championship.  Gibson served as the head men's basketball coach at Charleston Southern University from 1967 to 1971 and the University of North Carolina at Wilmington (UNC Wilmington) from 1972 to 1986.

Career statistics

NBA

Regular season

Source

References

External links
 

1940 births
Living people
American men's basketball coaches
American men's basketball players
Basketball coaches from North Carolina
Basketball players at the 1963 Pan American Games
Basketball players from North Carolina
Charleston Southern Buccaneers men's basketball coaches
College men's basketball head coaches in the United States
Los Angeles Lakers draft picks
Los Angeles Lakers players
Pan American Games gold medalists for the United States
Pan American Games medalists in basketball
Point guards
Shooting guards
UNC Wilmington Seahawks men's basketball coaches
United States men's national basketball team players
Western Carolina Catamounts men's basketball players
Wilmington Blue Bombers players
Medalists at the 1963 Pan American Games
1963 FIBA World Championship players